Bonifazio Graziani (1604/05 in Marino near Rome – 15 June 1664, in Rome) was an Italian organist, composer and clergyman in the Baroque period.

Works 
Published in print:
 Motetti a due, tre, quattro, cinque, e sei voci (Op. 1), Rom Vitale Mascardi, 1650
 Il secondo libro de motetti a due, tre, quattro, cinque e sei voci(Op. 2), Rom Vitale Mascardi, 1652
 Il primo libro de motetti a voce sola (Op. 3), Roma, Vitale Mascardi 1652; weitere Auflagen bei Maurizio Balmonti 1655, Ignazio de Lazzari 1661
 Psalmi vespertini quinque vocibus cum organo, et sine organo decantandi... lib. I, opus quartum (Op. 4), Rom Nicolo Germani/Vitale Mascardi 1652
 Psalmi vespertini quinque vocibus concinendi, opus quintum (Op. 5), Rom Vitale Mascardi, 1653
 Il secondo libro de motetti a voce sola. opera sesta (Op. 6), Rom Maurizio Balmonti, 1655
 Motetti a due, tre, e cinque voci... libro terzo, opera settima (Op. 7), Rom Maurizio Balmonti, 1656
 Il terzo libro de motetti a voce sola... opera ottava (Op. 8), Rom Giacomo Fei, 1658
 Responsoria hebdomadae sanctae, quatuor vocibus concinenda, una cum organo si placet (Op. 9), Rom Ignazio de Lazari, 1663
 Del quarto libro de motetti a voce sola... opera decima (Op. 10), Rom Giacomo Fei, 1665
 Litanie della Madonna a quattro, cinque, sette e otto voci... opera undecima (Op. 11), Rom Giacomo Fei, 1665
 Motetti a due, tre, quattro, e cinque voci per ogni tempo ... opera XII (Op. 12), Rom, Mascardi Heirs, 1673
 Antifone della Beatissima Vergine Maria, solite ricitarsi tutto l'anno doppo l'offizio divino... a quattro, cinque e sei voci... opera decima terza (Op. 13), Rom Giacomo Fei, 1665
 Antifone per diverse festività di tutto l'anno, a due, tre, e quattro voci... parte prima, opera decima quarta (Op. 14), Rom Ignazio de Lazari 1666
 Sacri concerti... a due, tre, quattro e cinque voci... opera decimaquinta (Op. 15), Rom Amadeo Belmonte 1668
 Partitura del quinto libro de'motetti a voce sola... opera XVI (Op. 16), Rom Amadeo Belmonte 1669
 Psalmi vespertini binis choris, una cum organo certatim, suaviterque decantandi... opus XVII (Op. 17), Rom Amadeo Belmonte, 1670
 Il primo libro delle messe a quattro, e cinque... opera decima ottava (Op. 18), Rom Angelo Mutii 1671
 Sacrae cantiones una tantum voce cum organo decantandae... liber sextus, opus XIX (Op. 19), Rom Mascardi Heirs 1672
 Motetti a due, tre, quattro, e cinque voci... lib. VI, opera XX (Op. 20), Rom, Mascardi Heirs 1672
 Hinni vespertini per tutte le principali festività dell'anno, composti in musica a tre, quattro, e cinque voci, alcuni con li ripieni... opera XXI (Op. 21), Rom Mascardi Heirs 1673
 Il secondo libro delle messe a quattro, cinque, e otto voci... opera XXII (Op. 22), Rom Mascardi Heirs 1674
 Motetti a due, tre e quattro voci... opera XXIII (Op. 23), Rom Mascardi Heirs 1674
 Motetti a due, tre, quattro e cinque voci... opera XXIV (Op. 24), Rom Mascardi 1676
 Musiche sagre, e morali composte ad'una, due, tre, e quattro voci... opera XXV (Op. 25), Rom Mascardi Heirs 1678
 Motetti a due, e tre voci (ohne Opuszahl), Rom Giacomo Fei 1667

Literature 
 Susanne Shigihara: Bonifazio Graziani (1604/05–1664). Biographie, Werkverzeichnis und Untersuchungen zu den Solomotetten. Bonn 1984 (Dissertation)

External links 
 Norma Mazzoli: Graziani, Bonifazio im Dizionario Biografico degli Italiani - Volume 58 (2002)
 

1605 births
1664 deaths
Italian Baroque composers
Italian classical organists
Male classical organists